Callidula plioxantha is a moth of the  family Callidulidae. It is found on New Guinea

References

Callidulidae
Lepidoptera of New Guinea
Moths described in 1877